Charles Edward Hern (1848–1894) was an English painter who worked with watercolours.  He moved to Australia in 1873 for about ten years but returned to England before his death.

References

External links
 

1848 births
1894 deaths
English painters